Mohammad Haroon Rashid is a Janata Dal (United) politician from Bihar. He is Deputy Chairman of Bihar Legislative Council. He was elected unanimously after post fell vacant after incumbent Deputy Chairman Salim Parvez lost the council election. Rashid was part of 1974 JP Movement.

References 

1954 births
Living people
Janata Dal (United) politicians
Members of the Bihar Legislative Council
People from Supaul district
Deputy Chairman of Bihar Legislative Council